Stuart Steele (born 28 March 1972) is a former Australian rules footballer who played for Richmond in the Australian Football League (AFL) in 1993. He was recruited from the Hawthorn reserves team, with the 7th selection in the 1993 pre-season draft.  He attended Scotch College, Melbourne as did his grandfather, Ray Steele, who also played for Richmond.

References

External links

Living people
1972 births
Richmond Football Club players
Old Scotch Football Club players
People educated at Scotch College, Melbourne
Australian rules footballers from Victoria (Australia)